Leon United Methodist Church, now known as the Leon Historical Society Museum, is a historic United Methodist church building located at Leon in Cattaraugus County, New York.  It was constructed in 1836 and is in the Gothic Revival style.

It was listed on the National Register of Historic Places in 2000.

References

External links
Historical marker/historic landmark for Leon United Methodist Church in Leon, NY
Leon Historical Society Museum - official site
Leon Historical Society Museum | New York's Amish Trail

Museums in Cattaraugus County, New York
History museums in New York (state)
Historical society museums in New York (state)
Churches on the National Register of Historic Places in New York (state)
United Methodist churches in New York (state)
Carpenter Gothic church buildings in New York (state)
Churches completed in 1836
19th-century Methodist church buildings in the United States
National Register of Historic Places in Cattaraugus County, New York